Kashk is a food.

Kashk or Keshk may also refer to:

Kashk, East Azerbaijan, a village in East Azerbaijan Province, Iran
Kashk, Khoshab, a village in Khoshab County, Razavi Khorasan Province, Iran